Milleria adalifoides is a moth in the family Zygaenidae. It is found in the Philippines.

References

Moths described in 1925
Chalcosiinae